In enzymology, a vomifoliol dehydrogenase is an enzyme that catalyzes the chemical reaction

(6S,9R)-6-hydroxy-3-oxo-alpha-ionol + NAD+  (6R)-6-hydroxy-3-oxo-alpha-ionone + NADH + H+

Thus, the two substrates of this enzyme are (6S,9R)-6-hydroxy-3-oxo-alpha-ionol and NAD+, whereas its 3 products are (6R)-6-hydroxy-3-oxo-alpha-ionone, NADH, and H+.

This enzyme belongs to the family of oxidoreductases, specifically those acting on the CH-OH group of donor with NAD+ or NADP+ as acceptor. The systematic name of this enzyme class is vomifoliol:NAD+ oxidoreductase. Other names in common use include vomifoliol 4'-dehydrogenase, and vomifoliol:NAD+ 4'-oxidoreductase.

References

 

EC 1.1.1
NADH-dependent enzymes
Enzymes of unknown structure